Elizabeth "Liz" McMahon (born February 27, 1993) is an American volleyball player.  She was a silver medalist on the 2010 Junior Olympic volleyball team, the first athlete at the University of Illinois to win the Senior Class award, and a gold medalist at the 2017 Pan American Cup.

Early life and education 
McMahon was born on February 27, 1993, to parents Kevin and Janine McMahon. She has a brother, Colin, and a sister, Clare.  She graduated from Lakota West High School in West Chester, Ohio, in 2011.  While in high school, she was ranked as the number three recruit in the United States.  She attended the University of Illinois. Where she was the tallest player in Illini volleyball history.  McMahon graduated in 2015 with a degree in sports management. Throughout her college career she would make multiple visits to the local elementary schools as a part of the Hometown Heroes program, which is a program based on giving back to the community.

Volleyball career 
During McMahon's high school career she was ranked as the number three recruit in the United States.  Hitting over 300 kills each season in high school, McMahon was named a two-time first-team All-Greater Miami Conference performer.  She hurt her elbow in her senior year missing most of the season, but returning to complete the last month.  She now holds the record for the most kills (1,086) at Lakota West High School. While just a college freshman she started in 34 out of 37 matches at right side, but got to play in all 37.  McMahon had a dominating blocking presence in multiple big games during the 2011 season. She was named to the Big Ten All-Freshman team. McMahon started in 14 out of the 30 matches her sophomore season.  In 2012, she led the team in blocks and second for kills with 400, which would turn out to be her college career high. During her junior season McMahon reached her 1,000th career kill against Northwestern.  At the end of the season she was ranked 21st amongst all juniors and 124th amongst all active players in career kills. As a senior, McMahon started every match as outside hitter and ended the season with a total of 396 kills and 110 blocks.  Her season also ended with her being ranked as 10th in the Big Ten for points per set and 13th in kills per set. She was then awarded the Senior CLASS award because of her great achievements on the volleyball court, in the classroom, and in the community.  McMahon was also named to the Academic All-Big Ten team her sophomore through senior year. McMahon made her professional debut on the U.S. Women's Volleyball National team at the 2017 Pan American Cup and became a gold medalist. She was then replaced, by a coaches decision, with Annie Drews, an outside/right-side hitter from Purdue for the following season.

Awards and achievements

2010 

 Silver medal at the Junior Olympics

2011 

Big Ten All-Freshman Team
Big Ten/ BIG EAST Challenge All-Tournament Team

2012 

All-Big Ten
Big Ten Distinguished Scholar
 Academic All-Big Ten
 Preseason All-Big Ten

2013 

AVCA All-Northeast Region Honorable Mention
 All-Big Ten Honorable Mention
Big Ten Distinguished Scholar
 Academic All-Big Ten
 Preseason All-Big Ten

2014 

Big Ten Medal of Honor
 Senior CLASS Award Winner
AVCA All-American Honorable Mention
 Capital One Academic All-District Second Team
AVCA All-Northeast Region
 All-Big Ten Honorable Mention
Big Ten Player of the Week (9/1)
Creighton Classic All-Tournament
 Blue Raider Bash All-Tournament
Big Ten/Pac-12 Challenge All-Tournament
 Illini Classic All-Tournament MVP
Big Ten Distinguished Scholar
 Academic All-Big Ten
 Preseason All-Big Ten

2017 
Pan American Cup Gold Medalist

References

External links
 
 

Living people
1993 births
Place of birth missing (living people)
Sportspeople from Ohio
American women's volleyball players
Volleyball players at the 2010 Summer Youth Olympics
Illinois Fighting Illini women's volleyball players